Saint Isan was a 6th-century saint of South Wales and Patron Saint of Llanishen near Cardiff, Wales.

He was said to have been a follower of the 6th-century Celtic teacher St Illtyd. 
In A.D. 535 he and Saint Edeyrn came eastwards from the small religious settlement of Llandaff, aiming to establish churches, in the area around Caerphilly mountain. The sites they choose had fresh water from the Nant Fawr stream.

Isan founded his church on the site of the modern-day Oval at Llanishen.

His co-worker Edeyrn was reputed to have travelled widely, and as a result there are churches in North and South Wales dedicated to his memory. St Edeyrn gathered together a community of about 300 that lived and worshipped in the Llanedeyrn area.

Isan is remembered in churches at Llanishen, Monmouthshire and Llanishen, Cardiff.

References

Medieval Welsh saints
6th-century Christian saints
6th-century births
Year of birth unknown
Year of death unknown
6th-century Welsh people